Mińsk Mazowiecki railway station is a railway station serving Mińsk Mazowiecki in Masovian Voivodeship, Poland. It is served by Koleje Mazowieckie (who run services from Warszawa Zachodnia to Łuków) Polregio and PKP Intercity (TLK services). Some international trains also serve the station.

The station was opened on 9 October 1866. The current building was opened in 1979. In 2006–2007, the station was refurbished further with the addition of an accessible underpass to all platforms. Mińsk Mazowiecki is classified as B importance in the categories of Polish rail stations.

References
Station article at kolej.one.pl

External links 
 

Railway stations in Poland opened in 1866
Railway stations in Masovian Voivodeship
Railway stations served by Koleje Mazowieckie
Mińsk County
Railway stations served by Przewozy Regionalne InterRegio
1866 establishments in the Russian Empire